Assad Zaman is a British actor. He is known for his stage work and his roles in the BBC thriller Apple Tree Yard (2017), the period drama Hotel Portofino (2022–) and the AMC series Interview with the Vampire (2022–).

Early life
Zaman grew up in the west end of Newcastle upon Tyne. His parents had arrived in England from Bangladesh in the 1980s. Zaman trained at the Manchester School of Theatre, graduating in 2013 with a Bachelor of Arts in Acting.

Career
Zaman made his London stage debut in the 2014 National Theatre production of Behind the Beautiful Forevers. This was followed by his onscreen debut in an episode Russell T Davies' Cucumber on Channel 4. He went on tour with Ayub Khan Din's play East is East that same year.

In 2017, Zaman played Sathnam in the BBC One adaptation of Apple Tree Yard. He had in the stage adaptation of Zadie Smith's White Teeth at the Kiln Theatre in 2018, The Funeral Director on tour and A Doll's House at the Lyric in Hammersmith in 2019, and The Winter's Tale in 2020. He appeared in the Red, White and Blue installment of Steve McQueen's Small Axe anthology. He returned to East is East in 2021 at the Birmingham Repertory Theatre. As of 2022, Zaman stars as Dr Anish Sengupta in the period drama Hotel Portofino and Armand in the AMC series Interview with the Vampire.

Filmography

Stage

References

External links
 
 Assad Zaman at Spotlight

Living people
21st-century English male actors
Actors from Newcastle upon Tyne
British male actors of South Asian descent
English male stage actors
English people of Bangladeshi descent
Year of birth missing (living people)